Menetus dilatatus is a species of small air-breathing freshwater snail, an aquatic pulmonate gastropod mollusk in the family Planorbidae, the ram's horn snails.

Shell description 
The shell is small, of a yellowish green-color, minutely wrinkled by the lines of growth. The spire is flat, composed of 2.5-3 whorls, separated by a well-defined suture. The outer whorl has a sharp margin on a level with the spire, diminishing near, but still modifying, the aperture. Below this line the whorl is very convexly rounded so as to encircle a small, deep, abruptly formed umbilicus. This whorl rapidly enlarges, and terminates in a very large, not very oblique aperture, with the lip expanded so as to make it trumpet-shaped.

The width of the shell is 2–3 mm. The height of the shell is 0.9 mm.

Distribution
The species is native to North America. The type locality is Nantucket island and Hingham, Massachusetts, USA.

Its non-native distribution includes:
 Czech Republic - non-indigenous, in Bohemia around Elber river and in Southern Bohemia
 Germany
 Netherlands
 Poland
 Great Britain

Habitat
This snail lives in freshwater biotopes.

References
This article incorporates public domain text from the reference.

External links 
 Goodchild C. G. & Fried B. (1963). "Experimental Infection of the Planorbid Snail Menetus dilatatus buchanensis (Lea) with Spirorchis sp. (Trematoda)". The Journal of Parasitology 49(4): 588-592. JSTOR.
 http://spinner.cofc.edu/~fwgna/species/planorbidae/m_dilatatus.html

Planorbidae
Molluscs of North America
Fauna of the Great Lakes region (North America)
Fauna of the Northeastern United States
Gastropods described in 1841